The Scolecocampinae are a subfamily of moths in the family Erebidae. The taxon was erected by Augustus Radcliffe Grote in 1883.

Taxonomy
Moths in the subfamily typically have an enclosed, sac-like tympanal pocket, split genital claspers with "costa extended dorsoapically into a long, free process," and a slender sacculus.

Phylogenetic analysis supports the subfamily as a clade within Erebidae, but its contents are a topic of further study.

Genera
Abablemma
Arugisa
Gabara
Nigetia
Palpidia
Pharga
Phobolosia
Pseudorgyia
Scolecocampa
Sigela

References

 
Moth subfamilies